Mike Mallory (born November 16, 1962) is an American football coach and a former player who is the Special Teams Coordinator  for the Denver Broncos NFL football team in 2022.  Before that, he most recently worked as assistant special teams coordinator for the Jacksonville Jaguars of the National Football League (NFL). He played college football as a linebacker for the University of Michigan from 1982 to 1985.  He was the Most Valuable Player for the 1984 Michigan team and was a finalist for the Butkus Award in 1985.  Since 1986, he has been a college football coach, including stints as the defensive coordinator for the Rhode Island Rams (1993–1995), Northern Illinois Huskies (1996–1999), Illinois Fighting Illini (2004–2005). He was also the assistant special teams coach of the New Orleans Saints from 2008 to 2012.

Playing career
Mallory was born in Bowling Green, Ohio. He was an all-state football player at Illinois' DeKalb High School in 1980.

Mallory played for the Michigan Wolverines from 1982 to 1985.  He was voted the Most Valuable Player of the 1984 team and was named a team co-captain and an All-Big Ten Conference player in 1984 and 1985.  He was one of five finalists for the Butkus Award in its inaugural year in 1985, losing out to Brian Bosworth; the Butkus Award has been given annually since 1985 to the top linebacker in college football.  As a senior in 1985, Mallory helped lead the Wolverines to a 10–1–1 record and a #2 ranking in the final AP Poll after beating Nebraska, 27–23, in the Fiesta Bowl.  At the end of the 1985 season, he was selected as an All-Big Ten linebacker.

The 1985 Wolverines defense that included Mallory, Mike Hammerstein, Brad Cochran, Mark Messner, Eric Kattus, Garland Rivers and Andy Moeller, gave up only 75 points in 11 regular season games, an average of less than seven points per game.  When Mallory graduated, his 211 career tackles ranked third in school history behind Ron Simpkins and Mike Boren.  He now ranks seventh in school history. Mallory graduated from Michigan in 1985 with a bachelor's degree in sports administration.

Statistics at Michigan

Family
Mallory is the oldest son of Bill Mallory, who has served as the head football coach at Miami University, the University of Colorado at Boulder, Northern Illinois University, and Indiana University.  When Ron Turner and his staff at Illinois were fired at the end of the 2004 season, Mike was rehired by Ron Zook as defensive coordinator.  Zook played for the elder Mallory at Miami University in the 1970s.  Curt Mallory, Mike's younger brother, was also hired by Zook, who said, "I am thrilled to have on our staff two sons of the man I played for and who led me into this profession."  Curt is currently the head coach of the Indiana State Sycamores football team.  Another brother, Doug, coaches in the NFL as the defensive backs for the Atlanta Falcons. He has an older sister, Barb.

Mike Mallory and his wife, Kim, have a daughter, Kathryn, and a son, William Michael.

References

External links
 Jacksonville Jaguars profile

1963 births
Living people
American football linebackers
Eastern Illinois Panthers football coaches
Illinois Fighting Illini football coaches
Indiana Hoosiers football coaches
Jacksonville Jaguars coaches
Louisville Cardinals football coaches
Kansas Jayhawks football coaches
Kent State Golden Flashes football coaches
Maryland Terrapins football coaches
Michigan Wolverines football players
New Orleans Saints coaches
Northern Illinois Huskies football coaches
Rhode Island Rams football coaches
People from DeKalb, Illinois
Players of American football from Illinois
Denver Broncos coaches